The 1984 PBA season was the 10th season of the Philippine Basketball Association (PBA).

Board of governors

Executive committee
 Mariano A. Yenko, Jr. (Commissioner) 
 Tomas L. Manotoc (Deputy Commissioner) 
 Carlos Palanca III  (President, representing Gilbey's Gin Tonics)
 Jose Ibazeta, Jr. (Vice-President and Treasurer, representing Gold Eagle Beermen)

Teams

Season highlights
The season marked the first without the multi-titled Toyota as the ballclub disbanded at the start of the year and sold its franchise to Asia Brewery, which played their first season under the name of Beer Hausen.
The NCC basketball team, the national training team coached by Ron Jacobs, played in the first two conferences as guest team.
The PBA was forced to have two All-Filipino Conferences as the nation reeled from year-round economic crisis; the import-laced tournament did return in the Third Conference.  
The Crispa Redmanizers played their final season in the PBA, winning their 13th and final championship during the first All-Filipino Conference.
The Great Taste Coffee Makers won its first two titles during this season, becoming the newest dynasty in the pro league. 
Ramon Fernandez received his second Most Valuable Player Award, highlighted by a year of more than 20 triple-double performances and a near triple-double average for the whole season.

Champions
 First All Filipino Conference: Crispa Redmanizers
 Second All Filipino Conference: Great Taste Coffee Makers
 Invitational Championship: Great Taste Coffee Makers
 Team with best win–loss percentage: Great Taste Coffee Makers (39-14, .736)
 Best Team of the Year: Great Taste Coffee Makers (1st)

First All-Filipino Conference

Elimination round

Quarterfinal round

Semifinal round

Third place playoffs 

|}

Finals

|}

Second All-Filipino Conference

Classification round

Quarterfinals

|}

Semifinal round

Third place playoffs 

|}

Finals

|}

Invitational Championship

Elimination round

Third place playoffs 

|}

Finals

|}
Best Import of the Conference: Jeff Collins (Great Taste)

Awards
 Most Valuable Player: Ramon Fernandez (Beer Hausen) 
 Rookie of the Year: Willie Pearson (Crispa)
 Most Improved Player: Manny Victorino (Great Taste)
 Best Import-Invitational: Jeff Collins (Great Taste)
 Mythical Five: 
Ricardo Brown (Great Taste)
Atoy Co (Crispa)
Abet Guidaben (Crispa)
Manny Victorino (Great Taste)
Ramon Fernandez (Beer Hausen)
 Mythical Second Team: 
Willie Pearson (Crispa)
Bernie Fabiosa (Crispa)
Terry Saldaña (Gilbey's Gin)
Bogs Adornado (Great Taste)
Philip Cezar (Crispa)

Cumulative standings

References

 
PBA